Mexicanal is a Mexican-based Spanish-language pay television network launched the August 23, 2005 by Castalia Communications and Cablecom. The network's studios and broadcast center is based in the Mexican city of San Luis Potosí.

Programming
Mexicanal features news, cultural programming, sports and popular entertainment from public broadcasters, independent producers and public access stations throughout Mexico.

Programming on Mexicanal also includes its daily news program, MX24 Noticias, featuring the top local, national and international news. It is anchored by Cecilia Mendez, with Raul Espinosa and Miguel Gallegos.

Other programs include:

 Ahí viene la Marimba,
 Con el Son de la Marimba,
 Estrellas del Jaripeo,
 De Kiosko en Kiosko, with host Cornelio Garcia visiting different municipalities in Jalisco to explore their culture, customs and traditions
 Vida y Estilo, a daily magazine show anchored by Marisol Castillo and Alberto Benitta
 Reportajes de Alvarado, hosted by Eduardo Alvarado featuring the towns of Nuevo León
 Estampas de Mi Provincia, where Zaida Nayeli and Paco Gómez show us Mexican cuisine, the traditions and the culture of Aguascalientes.
 Cuadrilatero Fabrica de Campeones, a monthly program that features young, aspiring boxers
 Supergrupero, featuring Mexico's popular grupera music
 Club C7, a children's show
 El Grito de Independencia (The Cry of Independence), La Ruta de Mexico (The Route of Mexico), shows that portrays the festivities and traditions of Mexicans.

Charter, AT&T, Mediacom, and Comcast offer Mexicanal in their "Spanish-language tier" lineups in the United States.

Mexicanal content
Since 2013 Mexicanal has been creating content:
 El Rayo Vida de Lucha, a reality series following the life of a lucha libra wrestler and promoter Juan Padron Luna, also known as "Rayo de Plata".  The series takes place in San Luis Potosi and the Bajío region of Mexico.  In thirteen episodes, "El Rayo Vida de Lucha" highlights the ties between El Rayo his family, employees and wrestlers.
 Son Mariachis, a docu-reality series following a new generation Mariachi band.  The band is composed of members of the Cuellar family.  Son Mariachis now airs on NBC Universo.
 Necaxa, a docu-reality series following a soccer franchise.
 Imágenes de México, hosted by Javier Solórzano, Images of Mexico is a tourism show highlighting eclectic regions of Mexico from regional history to agriculture.
 Dragon Con Adventure, hosted by Maria Fernanda Villanueva, highlighting Atlanta's Dragon Con 2015 parade cosplay and celebrities.

Mexican affiliates
While Mexicanal creates a limited amount of its own content, almost all of it is sourced from the various state networks, public broadcasters owned by the state governments. A notable exception is 20tv Zacatecas, which is a noncommercial station owned by commercial broadcaster Grupo Radiofónico B-15.

References

External links
 mexicanal.com
 Castalia Communications
 Cablecom Mexico
 Directv USA

Television channels and stations established in 2005
Spanish-language television networks in the United States
Television networks in Mexico
Mass media in San Luis Potosí City